Cirí Grande is a corregimiento in Capira District, Panamá Oeste Province, Panama with a population of 3,635 as of 2010. Its population as of 1990 was 4,138; its population as of 2000 was 3,079.

References

Corregimientos of Panamá Oeste Province